Lockwood may refer to:

Places

Australia
Lockwood, Victoria
Lockwood South, Victoria

United Kingdom
Lockwood, North Yorkshire, England
Lockwood, West Yorkshire, England

United States
Lockwood, Amador County, California
Lockwood, Monterey County, California
Lockwood, Michigan, an unincorporated community in Ovid Township, Branch County, Michigan
Lockwood, Missouri
Lockwood, Montana
Lockwood, Nebraska
Lockwood, New York, an unincorporated hamlet in the town of Barton, New York.
Lockwood, West Virginia

Greenland
Lockwood Island

Other uses 
Lockwood (surname), a list of people and fictional characters
Lockwood & Co., book series
Lockwood & Co. (TV series), TV series adaptation
Lockwood (company), lock brand in Australia
Lockwood Aircraft, an American ultralight aircraft manufacturer
Lockwood Broadcast Group, an American broadcasting company
Lockwood v. American Airlines, Inc., a 1997 United States patent law case